The 1994 Fort Worth Cavalry season was the first and only season for the Arena Football League franchise.

Pre-season

Regular season

Standings

z – clinched homefield advantage

y – clinched division title

x – clinched playoff spot

Playoffs

Playoffs

References

External links
Fort Worth Cavalry at ArenaFan.com

1994 Arena Football League season